Beth Ann Orton (born August 15, 1981) is an American professional racing cyclist, who most recently rode for UCI Women's Continental Team .

See also
 List of 2016 UCI Women's Teams and riders

References

External links
 

1981 births
Living people
American female cyclists
Place of birth missing (living people)
21st-century American women